George Eddy Downey (July 11, 1860 – May 24, 1926) was an Indiana attorney, mayor and judge, and later a judge of the Court of Claims.

Education and career

Born in Rising Sun, Indiana, Downey received a Bachelor of Arts degree from Indiana Asbury University (now DePauw University) in 1880, and a Master of Arts degree from the same institution in 1883. He practiced law in Rising Sun from 1881 to 1882, then took a position as the editor of the Franklin Democrat newspaper in Brookville, Indiana. After serving as editor from 1882 to 1884, he returned to his practice in Rising Sun. He moved to Aurora, Indiana in 1886 and was elected mayor of the town in 1894. He served several terms as mayor, leaving office in 1902. The following year, he was named a Judge of the Seventh Judicial Circuit of Indiana, where he served until 1913. President Woodrow Wilson appointed him Comptroller of the United States Department of the Treasury in 1913. He resigned in 1915.

Federal judicial service

Downey received a recess appointment from President Woodrow Wilson on August 3, 1915, to a seat on the Court of Claims (later the United States Court of Claims) vacated by Judge Charles Bowen Howry. He was nominated to the same position by President Wilson on January 7, 1916. He was confirmed by the United States Senate on January 17, 1916, and received his commission the same day. His service terminated on May 24, 1926, due to his death in Washington, D.C.

References

External links

1860 births
1926 deaths
DePauw University alumni
Judges of the United States Court of Claims
United States Article I federal judges appointed by Woodrow Wilson
20th-century American judges
People from Rising Sun, Indiana
Indiana lawyers
Editors of Indiana newspapers
People from Aurora, Indiana
20th-century American politicians
Mayors of places in Indiana
Comptrollers of the United States Treasury